Gloriosa is a symphonic poem for band composed by Yasuhide Ito. It has three movements:
 Oratio
 Cantus
 Dies Festus.

These songs are about Japanese Christians of the Edo Period and their fight to keep their beliefs.  This stirring and powerful homage to early Christianity in Japan profoundly and eloquently states the case of cross-cultural conflict and the discrimination Japanese Christians faced by their government.

Note by the composer

Commissioned in 1989 and premiered in 1990 by the Sasebo Band of the Maritime Self-Defense Force of Kyushu, southern Japan.  Gloriosa is inspired by the songs of the Kakure-Kirishitan (Crypto-Christians) of Kyushu who continued to practice their faith surreptitiously after the ban of Christianity by the nationalistic Japanese shogunate, which had been introduced to that southern region in the mid-16th century by Roman Catholic missionary Francisco Xavier. The worship brought with it a variety of western music.

Though Christianity was proscribed in 1612 by authority of the Tokugawa Shogunate in Edo (today Tokyo), Kakure-Kirishitan continued advocating sermons and disguised songs. Melodies and lyrics such as Gregorian chants were obliged to be “Japanized”. For example, the Latin word “Gloriosa” was changed to “Gururiyoza.” This adaptation of liturgy for survival inspired Ito to write this piece in order to reveal and solve the discrimination Christians in Japan faced.

The composer explains:

“Nagasaki district in Kyushu region continued to accept foreign culture even during the seclusion period, as Japan’s only window to the outer world. After the proscription of Christianity, the faith was preserved and handed down in secret in the Nagasaki and Shimabara areas of Kyushu region. My interest was piqued by the way in which the Latin words of Gregorian chants were gradually ‘Japanized’ during the 200 years of hidden practice of the Christian faith. That music forms the basis of Gloriosa.”

I. Oratio

The Gregorian chant “Gloriosa” begins with the words, “O gloriosa Domina excelsa super sidera que te creavit provide lactasti sacro ubere.” The first movement Oratio opens with bells sounding the hymn's initial phrases. The movement as a whole evokes the fervent prayers and suffering of the Crypto-Christians.

II. Cantus

The second movement, Cantus showcases a brilliant blend of Gregorian chant and Japanese elements by opening with a solo passage for the ryuteki, a type of flute. The theme is based on San Juan-sama no Uta (The Song of Saint John), a 17th-century song commemorating the “Great Martyrdom of Nagasaki” where a number of Kyushu Christians were killed in 1622.

III. Dies Festus

The third and final movement, Dies Festus, takes as its theme the Nagasaki folk song, Nagasaki Bura Bura Bushi, where many Crypto-Christians lived.

Gloriosa, fusing Gregorian chant and Japanese folk music, displays the most sophisticated counterpoint yet found in any Japanese composition for wind orchestra.

References
 Note by composer
 Gloriosa - Symphonic Poem for Band (I. Oratio  II. Cantus  III. Dies Festus) Bravo Music Website - Composer's note and Complete Wind Band Recording
 
 

Concert band pieces
1990 compositions
Symphonic poems
Classical music in Japan